The Roman Catholic Diocese of Yanji/Yenki is a diocese located in the city of Yanji (Jilin) in the Ecclesiastical province of Shenyang 瀋陽 in China.

History
 July 19, 1928: Established as the Apostolic Prefecture of Yanji 延吉 from the Apostolic Vicariate of Wonsan
 April 13, 1937: Promoted as Apostolic Vicariate of Yanji 延吉
 April 11, 1946: Promoted as Diocese of Yanji 延吉

Leadership
 Bishops of Yanji 延吉 (Roman rite)
 Fr. Timotheus Bitterli, O.S.B. (이 디모테오) (Apostolic Administrator April 9, 1954 – October 4, 1985)
 Bishop Theodor Breher, O.S.B. (April 11, 1946 – November 2, 1950)
 Prefects Apostolic of Yanji 延吉 (Roman Rite)
 Fr. Theodor Breher, O.S.B. (later Bishop) (February 5, 1929 – April 13, 1937)

References

 GCatholic.org
 Catholic Hierarchy

Roman Catholic dioceses in China
Christian organizations established in 1928
Roman Catholic dioceses and prelatures established in the 20th century
Organizations based in Jilin
Yanji